Isabelle Kalihangabo (born 1972) is a Rwandan lawyer and politician who has been Deputy Secretary General of  the Rwanda Investigation Bureau (RIB) since 2018.

Career 
Kalihangabo is a law graduate from the University of Rwanda and also has a Master's degree in International Business Law from Queen Mary University of London.
Between 2000 and 2004 she served in the Supreme Court of Rwanda in Department of Gacaca Jurisdictions. In 2004 she was appointed as a Judge to the High Court of Rwanda here she served until 2007. In 2007 she was made Assistant Attorney General in the Ministry of Justice with responsibility for legal advisory services.  A promotion in March 2014 saw her made Permanent Secretary and Solicitor General in the Ministry of Justice She remained in that role until 9 April 2018 when she was appointed by President as Deputy Secretary General of Rwanda Investigation Bureau.

References 

Rwandan lawyers
Rwandan women lawyers
Alumni of Queen Mary University of London
Rwandan judges
University of Rwanda alumni
Rwandan civil servants
1972 births
Living people
21st-century judges
21st-century women judges
21st-century lawyers
21st-century women lawyers